Christopher Charles Fonzone is an American attorney serving as the general counsel to the Office of the Director of National Intelligence.

Education 
Fonzone earned a Bachelor of Arts degree in English and economics from Cornell University in 1998 and a Juris Doctor from Harvard Law School in 2007.

Career 
From 2000 to 2004, Fonzone worked as a principal and engagement manager at Novantas, a financial services firm. In 2006 and 2007, he served as a law clerk for Judge J. Harvie Wilkinson III. In 2008 and 2009, he served as an appellate attorney in the United States Department of Justice Civil Rights Division. In 2009 and 2010, he served as a law clerk for Supreme Court Justice Stephen Breyer. From 2010 to 2012, he served as special counsel in the United States Department of Defense. In 2012, he also briefly served as an advisor in the Office of Legal Counsel. From 2013 to 2017, he served as deputy assistant and counsel to President Barack Obama, in addition to legal advisor to the United States National Security Council. In 2017, Fonzone became a partner at Sidley Austin.

In 2021, Fonzone was nominated to serve as general counsel to the Office of the Director of National Intelligence. During his confirmation process, he was criticized for his lobbying work on behalf of Huawei and China's Ministry of Commerce during his time at Sidley Austin. Fonzone was confirmed by a vote of 55–45.

References

Living people
Year of birth missing (living people)
Cornell University alumni
Harvard Law School alumni
United States Department of Justice officials
United States Department of Justice lawyers
United States Department of Defense officials
Obama administration personnel
Biden administration personnel
United States National Security Council staffers